The Ogilvie Professor of Human Geography is the name for the occupant of the Ogilvie Chair of Geography at the University of Edinburgh. It is named in honour of Alan Grant Ogilvie FRSE (1887-1954), the first professor (1931) of their Department of Geography and an important figure in the early years of the Department of Geography at Edinburgh, who had died in office.

List of Ogilvie Professors

 1966–1986 John Terence Coppock
 1990–2004 Susan J. Smith
 2004–2010 Lynn A. Staeheli
 2010–2019 Charles Withers
 2019–present Tim Cresswell

See also

 List of professorships at the University of Edinburgh

References

Human Geography, Ogilvie
Geography education in the United Kingdom
Human geography
Human Geography, Ogilvie